Michel Mézy (born 15 August 1948) is a French former professional football player and manager. As of August 2021, he holds the position of Presidential Advisor at Montpellier HSC.

Honours

Manager 
Montpellier

 Division 2: 1986–87
 Coupe de France: 1989–90
 UEFA Intertoto Cup runner-up: 1997

References

1948 births
Living people
French people of Hungarian descent
French footballers
France international footballers
Association football midfielders
Nîmes Olympique players
Lille OSC players
Montpellier HSC players
Ligue 1 players
French football managers
Montpellier HSC managers
Nîmes Olympique managers
Ligue 1 managers
Sportspeople from Gard
Montpellier HSC non-playing staff
Nîmes Olympique non-playing staff
ES Grau-du-Roi
Footballers from Occitania (administrative region)